Sebastian Rauch (born 29 September 1981) is a German retired footballer.

External links 
 

1981 births
Living people
German footballers
Association football goalkeepers
3. Liga players
SV Babelsberg 03 players